Mart Enrico Escudero (born April 11, 1990) is a Filipino actor, model, and television personality. He rose to fame during his stint at the fourth season of StarStruck. He also starred in the indie film Zombadings: Patayin sa Shokot si Remington with Kerbie Zamora.

Early life and education
Escudero studied at the Academe of St. Jude Thaddeus in GMA, Cavite, where he was an active participant of the Boy Scouts of the Philippines under the leadership of Eagle Scout Andrew Alcantara. He was only a 2nd Year high school student when he was accepted as a contestant in Starstruck.

Career
Escudero was an exclusive artist at GMA Network. His last show in the network was Jillian: Namamasko Po, until he returned in 2017.

He is a former contract star under the talent agency of TV5 Network named Talent5. In 2011, he made his first appearance in the network through the drama Babaeng Hampaslupa. Martin is set to appear in the romantic comedy television show Kano Luvs Pinay starting on September 5, 2015. He also stars in TV5's first online sitcom entitled Tanods.

Since 2017, Escudero is a freelancer, appearing on both GMA Network and ABS-CBN.

Personal life
He is the nephew of former Governor of Sorsogon now current Senator Chiz Escudero, and a grandson of the late former Congressman Salvador Escudero and former Congresswoman Evelina Escudero.

He was in a relationship with his former onscreen partner, Jennica Garcia, from December 2007 to February 2009. They have maintained their friendship, and are professional in dealing with their joint projects.
 
He is pursuing Bachelor of Science in Hotel and Restaurant Management at the Alabang branch of STI College.

Filmography

Television

Film

Online shows

Awards and nominations

References

External links

1990 births
Star Magic
21st-century Filipino male actors
Filipino male child actors
Filipino male television actors
Living people
Male actors from Cavite
People from Quezon City
ABS-CBN personalities
StarStruck (Philippine TV series) participants
StarStruck (Philippine TV series) winners
GMA Network personalities
TV5 (Philippine TV network) personalities